Ezequiel Teixeira (born 25 February 1955) is a Brazilian politician as well as a lawyer and pastor. He has spent his political career representing Rio de Janeiro, having served as state representative from 2015 to 2019.

Personal life
Teixeira is the son of João de Lourdes Teixeira and Maria Cortaz Teixeira. Teixeira is married to Márcia Teixeira, and has a daughter named Tatiana Teixeira. He is one of the pastors of an evangelical christian church Projeto Vida Nova in Nilópolis.

Political career
Teixeira voted in favor of the impeachment of then-president Dilma Rousseff. Teixeira voted in favor of the 2017 Brazilian labor reform, and would vote against a corruption investigation into Rousseff's successor Michel Temer.

There was some controversy when then governor of Rio de Janeiro Luiz Fernando Pezão nominated Teixeira as Secretariat of Human Rights in 2016. LGBT rights groups such as "Rio Sem Homofobia" protest the decision as Teixeira has supported conversion therapy in his church.

References

1955 births
Living people
Brazilian evangelicals
Evangelical pastors
Brazilian clergy
20th-century Brazilian lawyers
Members of the Chamber of Deputies (Brazil) from Rio de Janeiro (state)
Members of the Legislative Assembly of Rio de Janeiro
Politicians from Rio de Janeiro (city)
Solidariedade politicians